Tullie McAdoo (November 24, 1884 – June 16, 1961) was an American baseball first baseman in the Negro leagues. He played from 1908 to 1924 with several teams, playing mostly with the St. Louis Giants.

McAdoo played the first part of the 1910 season for the Oklahoma Monarchs, however he and two other players, third baseman J. Norman and outfielder D. Williams, were given unconditional releases from their contracts when they broke club rules by playing a morning baseball game for the Kansas City Royal Giants on the morning of July 4, 1910. The afternoon game was delayed due to having to wait for the three players to arrive. By the end of the month, McAdoo was playing with the Kansas City Royal Giants.

McAdoo worked first base for the Salt Lake City Occidental Club in 1910. The team finished second that year in the Utah state league. He moved back east to join the French Lick Plutos for the 1911 season, but came back to the Occidentals in May 1911. At some point in 1911, McAdoo moved East again to join the St. Louis Giants.

He was still playing for the St. Louis Giants when the team joined the Negro National League in 1920.

References

External links
 and Baseball-Reference Black Baseball stats and Seamheads

1884 births
1961 deaths
Kansas City Monarchs players
St. Louis Giants players
Cleveland Browns (baseball) players
St. Louis Stars (baseball) players
St. Louis Giants (1924) players
Chicago Giants players
San Francisco Park players
American expatriate baseball players in Cuba
20th-century African-American people
Baseball infielders
Kansas City Giants players